The Irish Indoor Athletics Championships, also known as the National Senior Indoor Championships, is an annual indoor track and field competition organised by Athletics Ireland, which serves as the Irish national championship for the sport.

It was first organised in 1988 by the Bord Luthchleas na hEireann (Irish Athletic Board), which later folded into Athletics Ireland and made the competition an all-Ireland championships from 2000 onwards. Athletes from Northern Ireland are also eligible to compete at the British Indoor Athletics Championships, which has a higher standard of competition, though many opt to compete at the Irish event for personal or logistical reasons.

Typically contested in February, the competition features championships for both men and women, with 28 events divided equally between the sexes. The event has had a regular title sponsor, with Woodie's DIY serving from 2007 to 2014 and Irish Life/GloHealth from 2015 to present. Since 2003, non-Irish athletes may participate as guests only, though non-Irish athletes may compete if they are members of an athletics club in the Republic of Ireland.

Events
The following athletics events feature as standard on the Irish Indoor Championships programme:

 Sprint: 60 m, 200 m, 400 m
 Distance track events: 800 m, 1500 m, 3000 m
 Hurdles: 60 m hurdles
 Jumps: long jump, triple jump, high jump, pole vault
 Throws: shot put
 Racewalking: 5000 m (men), 3000 m (women)
 Combined events: heptathlon (men), pentathlon (women)

Editions

Venues 

The Irish Indoor Championships has been held at four different venues during its lifetime. The Nenagh Arena in Nenagh has hosted the event the most, serving as host on sixteen occasions in an unbroken run from 1988 to 2002. It was the only indoor track and field stadium in the country during that time. The Odyssey Arena in Belfast became a regular host after that period, holding all but one of the championships from 2002 to 2012. The AIT International Arena in Athlone served as the host venue from 2012 to 2016.

Championships records

Men

References

External links
Athletics Ireland website

 
Athletics competitions in Ireland
National indoor athletics competitions
Recurring sporting events established in 1988
1988 establishments in Ireland
February sporting events
Athletics indoor